The name Summaron is used by Leica to designate camera lenses that have a maximum aperture of f/2.8 or f/3.5 or f/5.6.

History
The Summaron 35 mm f/3.5 was introduced in 1945. It was manufactured both for the Leica screwmount cameras and Leica M cameras. It was manufactured until the 1960s and over 100,000 units were produced, making it one of the most common Leica wide-angle lenses ever made. The lens was then discontinued in 1963 just before the first 28mm f/2.8 Elmarit became available for the M cameras.

The Summaron name was revived in 2016 when the 28 mm f/5.6 was released.

Description
Several lens has been designated with the name Summaron, confusingly with a variety of f-numbers. The only thing in common between these lenses were that they were generally wide-angle and extremely small (sometimes referred to as pancake lenses).

Market positions
The Summaron are some of the smallest lens in the Leica range, but because of its low maximum aperture it is cheaper than other lenses.

List of Summaron lenses

For the M39 lens mount

For the Leica M mount

References

External links
 

Leica lenses
Photographic lenses